Suomalaisen Sana-Lugun Coetus (1745) by Daniel Juslenius was the first comprehensive dictionary of the Finnish language. It contains about 16 000 words of the Finnish language, at the end of which is a Swedish list of words. The dictionary contains a lot of artificial neologisms from the 18th century.

The dictionary was republished in 1917 by Salomon Kreander and Juhana Canstrén and edited by A. V. Koskimies. A facsimile of the dictionary was published in 1968.

Further reading
 Juslenius, Daniel (1745): Suomalaisen Sana-Lugun Coetus. Näköispainos H. G. Porthanille kuuluneesta sanakirjasta. Suomalaisen Kirjallisuuden Seura, Helsinki 1968.

References

External links
 Suomalaisen Sana-Lugun Coetus at the Bavarian State Library's online reading service
 

Finnish dictionaries
1745 books